Senzaki (written:  or ) is a Japanese surname. Notable people with the surname include:

, Japanese footballer
, Japanese shogi player
, Japanese Zen Buddhist

See also
Senzaki Station, a railway station in Nagato, Yamaguchi Prefecture, Japan

Japanese-language surnames